The United States House Select Subcommittee on the Coronavirus Pandemic, formerly the Select Subcommittee on the Coronavirus Crisis, is a bipartisan United States House of Representatives select subcommittee that Speaker Nancy Pelosi has announced will be created to provide congressional oversight of the Trump administration's response to the COVID-19 pandemic in the United States. The Select Subcommittee was established under H.Res.935 during the 116th Congress. Pelosi announced on April 2, 2020, that the committee will oversee the $2.2 trillion economic stimulus/rescue legislation (the Coronavirus Aid, Relief, and Economic Security Act) enacted by Congress.  The Act created a $500 billion bailout fund for U.S. industry and is the largest economic emergency legislation in U.S. history. It will be a special investigatory subcommittee under the House Oversight Committee.

Pelosi stated in her announcement that the committee will be chaired by House Majority Whip Jim Clyburn, aided by a staff of experts.  It will have subpoena power and a $2,000,000 budget. Pelosi charged the committee with preventing waste, profiteering, and price gouging, and seeking to ensure that responses to the pandemic are based on science. She described the committee as a mechanism for an after-action review.

The committee's mandate is analogous to that of the Truman Committee in the 1940s, which investigated waste and fraud in defense spending.

On April 23, 2020, the House officially voted 212–182 along party lines, to approve the committee's creation.

After Republicans gained a majority of the House of Representatives at the start of the 118th Congress, the House voted to continue the committee, now dubbed Select Subcommittee on the Coronavirus Pandemic, was approved as part of the House's rules package on January 9, 2023 by a 220-213 vote. The purpose of the committee was changed to investigate the origins of COVID-19, gain-of-function research, coronavirus-related government spending, and mask and vaccine mandates.

On January 24, 2023, Speaker Kevin McCarthy announced that the subcommittee would be chaired by Representative Brad Wenstrup.

During the committee's first hearing on March 8, Republican Jim Jordan—who is not a member of the committee—baselessly alleged that Anthony Fauci had steered a $9 million grant to two scientists in exchange for them changing their position that the virus had originated in a lab to originating naturally.

Members, 118th Congress

Historical Members

See also 
 COVID-19 Congressional Oversight Commission
 Pandemic Response Accountability Committee
 Special Inspector General for Pandemic Recovery

References

External links
 
 Speaker Pelosi's "Dear Colleague" Letter to All House Members Announcing Committee's Formation

House Oversight Coronavirus Crisis
House Oversight Coronavirus Crisis
Coronavirus Crisis
Oversight Coronavirus Crisis
2020 establishments in Washington, D.C.